Osmundastrum is genus of leptosporangiate ferns in the family Osmundaceae with one living species, Osmundastrum cinnamomeum, the cinnamon fern. It is native to the Americas and eastern Asia, growing in swamps, bogs and moist woodlands.

In North America it occurs from southern Labrador west to Ontario, and south through the eastern United States to eastern Mexico and the West Indies; in South America it occurs west to Peru and south to Paraguay. In Asia it occurs from southeastern Siberia south through Japan, Korea, China and Taiwan to Myanmar, Thailand and Vietnam. Osmundastrum cinnamomeum has a fossil record extending into the Late Cretaceous of North America, approximately 70 million years ago, making it one of the oldest living plant species. The fossil records of the genus extend into the Triassic.

Characteristics

Osmundastrum cinnamomeum is a deciduous herbaceous plant that produces separate fertile and sterile fronds. The fertile leaves appear first; their green color slowly becomes brown as the season progresses and the spores are dropped. The spore-bearing stems persist after the sterile fronds are killed by frost, until the next season. The spores must develop within a few weeks or fail.

The Osmundastrum cinnamomeum fern forms huge clonal colonies in swampy areas. These ferns form massive rootstocks with densely matted, wiry roots. This root mass is an excellent substrate for many epiphytal plants. They are often harvested as osmunda fiber and used horticulturally, especially in propagating and growing orchids. Cinnamon Ferns do not actually produce cinnamon; they are named for the color of the fertile fronds.

Classification

Traditionally, this plant has been classified as Osmunda cinnamomea L. However, recent genetic and morphological evidence (Metzgar et al. 2008; Jud et al. 2008) clearly demonstrate that the cinnamon fern is a sister species to the entire rest of the living Osmundaceae.  Cladistically, it is either necessary then to include all species of the Osmundaceae, including Todea and Leptopteris in the genus Osmunda, or else it is necessary to segregate the genus Osmundastrum.  O. cinnamomeum is the sole living species in the genus, although it is possible that some additional fossils should be assigned to Osmundastrum.

Formerly, some authors included the interrupted fern, Osmunda claytoniana, in the genus or section Osmundastrum, because of its gross apparent morphological similarities. However, detailed morphology and genetic analysis have proven that the interrupted fern is actually a true Osmunda. This is borne out by the fact that it is known to hybridize with the American royal fern, Osmunda spectabilis to produce Osmunda × ruggii in a family in which hybrids are rare, while Osmundastrum cinnamomeum has no known hybrids.

Osmundastrum cinnamomeum is considered a living fossil because it has been identified in the geologic record as far back as 75 million years ago. The oldest member of the genus is O. indentatum from the Triassic of Tasmania, Australia.

The Asian and American populations of cinnamon fern are generally considered to be varieties of a single species, but some botanists classify them as separate species.  The Asian taxon is thus named Osmundastrum asiaticum.

Uses 
According to the Native American Ethnobotany Database, cinnamon fern has been historically used by first nations tribes (Abnaki, Menominee) as a food source.  The Iroquois and Cherokee tribes used the fern for a wide variety of medicinal purposes including as a cold remedy, gynecological aid, venereal aid, and as a remedy to snake bites.

References

Further reading
Metzgar, Jordan S., Judith E. Skog, Elizabeth A. Zimmer, and Kathleen M. Pryer (2008). "The Paraphyly of Osmunda is Confirmed by Phylogenetic Analyses of Seven Plastid Loci." Systematic Botany, 33(1): pp. 31–36.
Serbet, Rudolf, and Gar W. Rothwell (1999). "Osmunda cinnamomea (Osmundaceae) in the Upper Cretaceous of western North America: Additional evidence for exceptional species longevity among filicalean ferns." International Journal of Plant Sciences, 160: 425–433.

External links
USDA Plants treatment: Osmundastrum cinnamomeum (Cinnamon fern)
Flora of North America: Flora of North America treatment: Osmunda cinnamomea
Flora of North America: RangeMap: Osmunda cinnamomea

Flora of Taiwan: Osmunda cinnamomea 
Rook.org - Cinnamon fern description & photo

Osmundales
Plants described in 1753
Taxa named by Carl Linnaeus
Monotypic fern genera